Fluent In Stroll is the fifth studio album by the Boston ska punk band Big D and the Kids Table, released on July 7, 2009 by Side One Dummy Records. It was produced by Joe Gittleman of The Mighty Mighty Bosstones and features backing vocals by Sirae Richardson, Hayley Jane, and Nicole and Simone Olivia, who perform as the Doped Up Dollies. Its title refers to the band's new musical direction dubbed "stroll", a mix of double-Dutch, ska, reggae, and soul.

Track listing
 "Doped Up Dollies on a One Way Ticket to Blood" - 4:13
 "Describing the Sky" - 4:29
 "Not Fucking Around" - 3:34
 "A Kiss a Week" - 3:53
 "Been Wishing On" - 3:15
 "Fluent in Stroll" - 2:49
 "Down Around Here" - 3:51
 "Chin Up, Boy!" - 3:28
 "Where Did All the Women Go?" - 3:36
 "Known to Be Blue" - 1:01
 "I,I,I," - 3:32
 "Stop, Look & Listen (Shake Life Up)" - 5:03
 "My Thoughts Take Me Away" - 3:46
 "We Can Live Anywhere!" - 3:41

Chart positions

Personnel
David McWane - vocals, guitar
Sean P. Rogan - guitar, organ, piano, vocals
Steve Foote - bass guitar
Derek Davis - drum kit, percussion, vocals
Ryan O'Connor - saxophone, melodica, vocals
Dan Stoppelman - trumpet
Paul E. Cuttler - trombone
Joe Gittleman - producer
Paul Q. Kolderie - mixing
Hayley Jane, Sirae Richardson, Nicole Olivia, Simone Olivia - backing vocals
dj BC - scratching / samples

References

2009 albums
SideOneDummy Records albums
Big D and the Kids Table albums